Bogard Creek is a stream in northern Henry and southern Johnson counties in the U.S. state of Missouri.

Bogard Creek has the name of a pioneer citizen.

See also
List of rivers of Missouri

References

Rivers of Henry County, Missouri
Rivers of Johnson County, Missouri
Rivers of Missouri